Sidney Vivian (18 April 1901 – 22 December 1984) was a British stage, film and television actor.

Selected filmography

Film appearances

 Dick Barton Strikes Back (1949) - Inspector Burke
 Dr. Morelle: The Case of the Missing Heiress (1949) - Inspector Hood
 Diamond City (1949) - Reader (uncredited)
 Double Confession (1950) - Ring Stall Attendant
 No Trace (1950) - Barman
 Lady Godiva Rides Again (1951) - Councillor
 Whispering Smith Hits London (1951) - Hotel Porter
 Down Among the Z Men (1952) - Landlord Isaiah Crabb
 The Great Game (1953) - Club Chairman
 Stryker of the Yard (1953)
 One Stop Shop (1953) - Jim Brown
 The Scamp (1957) - Drunken Reveller
Rogue's Yarn (1957) - Corner Shop Proprietor 
 Carve Her Name with Pride (1958) - Bus Passenger (uncredited)
 The Key (1958) - Grogan
 The Secret Partner (1961) - Dock Foreman
 Mary Had a Little... (1961) - Grimmick
 Offbeat (1961) - Sam French
 Emergency (1962) - Shaw
 Gaolbreak (1962) - Mr. Marshall
 The Pot Carriers (1962) - Bus Conductor
 The Day of the Triffids (1963) - Ticket Agent (uncredited)
 I Could Go On Singing (1963) - Stagehand (uncredited)
 Hide and Seek (1964) - Commissionaire
 Subterfuge (1968) - Taxi Driver

Television appearances
 Frankly Howerd (1959) - Fred Thompson
 Sergeant Cork (1964) - Barman
 Gideon's Way (1964) - Danny
 Hadleigh (1969) - Barman
 Doctor in the House (1969-1970) - College Officer

Stage appearances
 She Wanted a Cream Front Door (Apollo Theatre, 1947)

References

External links
 

1901 births
1984 deaths
English male stage actors
English male film actors
English male television actors
Male actors from Manchester
20th-century English male actors